Julius Benjamin Freeman (November 7, 1868 – June 10, 1921), was a Major League Baseball pitcher for the 1888 St. Louis Browns of the American Association. At 19 years old, he lost his only start in the majors after having his finger broken by a line drive in the seventh inning of a game against the Louisville Colonels.

References

External links

1868 births
1921 deaths
Major League Baseball pitchers
St. Louis Browns (AA) players
19th-century baseball players
Baseball players from Missouri
Fort Smith Indians players
Milwaukee Brewers (minor league) players
Milwaukee Creams players